Cristian Antonio Guzmán (born March 21, 1978) is a Dominican former professional baseball shortstop. He played in Major League Baseball (MLB) for the Minnesota Twins, Washington Nationals, and Texas Rangers.

Professional career

Minnesota Twins

In , Guzmán was named to the AL All-Star team and posted career bests with 10 home runs and a .302 batting average. He was a key part of the Twins teams that won three consecutive American League Central titles from –. His total of 20 in 2000 was only the tenth time a player had reached that number in the last 70 years.

Washington Nationals
After becoming a free agent, Guzmán signed a $16.8 million, four-year contract with the Washington Nationals for the  season but then proceeded to have the worst year of his career. As the full-time shortstop, he was batting .192 at the end of August, but rallied in September, hitting .325, which helped bring his average up to .219.

Three days after the disastrous 2005 season, Guzmán had eye surgery, which he credited as a prime reason for his resurgence in the following years.

However, he injured his hamstring on the first day of the regular season. He was on the disabled list until May 7, 2007. Batting leadoff, he was hitting .329 (second on the team), and despite missing almost half of the season through late June, was third in the league with six triples. On June 24, however, Guzmán was injured while tagging out a would-be base-stealer, and had surgery the next day to repair a torn thumb ligament, sidelining him for the rest of the 2007 season.

On March 30, Guzmán got the first hit in the history of Nationals Park, a broken bat single to right off Atlanta Braves starter Tim Hudson. He followed with the first run in the history of the park, after an RBI double by Nick Johnson. He made the NL All-Star team as the Nationals' lone representative in 2008. He ended up playing third base in the All-Star Game, and made some crucial fielding plays at that position, even though he had previously only played shortstop as a major leaguer. On August 28, 2008, Guzmán hit for the cycle against the Los Angeles Dodgers; only the second cycle in Nationals history. Guzman signed a two-year contract extension to stay with the Nats.

He finished the 2008 season 4th the league in hits and batting average. By the All-Star break in 2009, he was fourth among active players for triples.

He had the lowest fielding percentage of any starting major league shortstop in 2009 (.962).

Texas Rangers
On July 31, 2010, the Texas Rangers acquired Guzmán from the Nationals for two minor leaguers, Tanner Roark and Ryan Tatusko. Guzman played his first game as a Ranger on August 1 against the Angels in L.A. and went 0–3 with a walk.

2011
Although Guzmán received spring training invitations from two teams, he was forced to miss at least the first half of the season to deal with unspecified family issues.

Cleveland Indians
Guzmán signed a minor league contract with the Cleveland Indians on February 21, 2012. After suffering a strained hamstring during spring training, he was released by the Indians on March 28.

He now resides in Washington Heights with his wife.

See also
 List of Major League Baseball annual triples leaders
 List of Major League Baseball players to hit for the cycle

References

External links

1978 births
Living people
American League All-Stars
Dominican Republic expatriate baseball players in the United States
Frisco RoughRiders players
Greensboro Bats players
Gulf Coast Twins players
Gulf Coast Yankees players
Major League Baseball players from the Dominican Republic
Major League Baseball shortstops
Minnesota Twins players
National League All-Stars
New Britain Rock Cats players
Tampa Yankees players
Texas Rangers players
Washington Nationals players
People from Baní